Hermann von Wedderkop (1875–1956) was a German writer. He also served as editor of the art magazine Der Querschnitt.

Career
Originally a legal assessor in Cologne, he met Alfred Flechtheim in Paris in 1907, who was an art dealer and later founder of Der Querschnitt. In 1912 he wrote an exhibition guide for the Sonderbund in Cologne. During World War I, Wedderkop was a civilian commissary of the German civilian administration in Brussels. Among others, he met there Gottfried Benn and Thea Sternheim and is said to have had an affair with Yvonne George during that time.

At the beginning of the 1920s, Wedderkop was a member of the advisory committee of the artists' association Das Junge Rheinland. In the series Junge Kunst published by Verlag Klinkhardt and Biermann Leipzig, he published the volumes on Paul Klee (1920) and Marie Laurencin (1921). From 1921 he was an employee of the Der Querschnitt. As editor, Wedderkop succeeded in making Der Querschnitt into the leading German Zeitgeist magazine of the 1920s: open to the artistic avant-garde, such as Pablo Picasso, Marc Chagall and Fernand Léger, and in addition to the heroes of boxing, ironically elitist and artistic photos of male and female nude models.

In Ernest Hemingway's posthumous memoirs "A Moveable Feast", Wedderkop is mentioned as a purchaser of his works and described as "awfully nice". Wedderkop's removal as chief editor in 1929 by the Ullstein Verlag, and from his editor's post there in May 1931, is said to have had something to do with his publicistic enthusiasm for Benito Mussolini, according to Wilmont Haacke. Wedderkop visited Mussolini on May 5 and October 10, 1930, and on May 28, 1935. He spent most of the period of Nazi Germany in Italy. Wedderkop's book Deutsche Graphik des Westens was placed on the list of harmful and undesirable literature by the Reichsschrifttumkammer of the Reichskulturkammer in 1938.

Alternatives
Wedderkop rejected the "old literature" by Gerhart Hauptmann and Thomas Mann, pressing instead for the social novel. In 1927, he published a corresponding autobiographically colored novel with Adieu Berlin. The book, set in the North Sea resort of Kampen, did not receive much attention.

More success came with his alternative travel books for Cologne, Düsseldorf, and Bonn (1928), Paris (1929), London and Rome (1930) and Oberitalien (1931), published by Piper Verlag in the series Was nicht im ″Baedeker″ steht. After 1938, Wedderkop appeared as the translator of the motivational trainer and author Dale Carnegie, later co-authored in German editions. Wedderkop also translated into German Et in Arcadia ego by the Italian writer Emilio Cecchi.

Works
Der Rhein von den Alpen bis zum Meere (1931)
Sizilien, schicksal einer insel (1940)
Die falsche Note; ein Musikroman (1940)

References

1875 births
1956 deaths
German male writers